GoodRx Holdings, Inc. is an American healthcare company that operates a telemedicine platform and a free-to-use website and mobile app that track prescription drug prices in the United States and provide cheap drug coupons for discounts on medications. GoodRx checks more than 75,000 pharmacies in the United States. In 2017, the website got about fourteen million visitors a month. As of February 25, 2020, "millions of people" had downloaded the GoodRx app.

GoodRx was founded in Santa Monica, California in 2011. In 2017, GoodRx announced partnerships with major prescription drug companies in the country to negotiate lower prescription drug costs. In September 2019, GoodRx acquired the telemedicine company HeyDoctor and rebranded the telemedicine platform as GoodRx Care. The platform allows individuals to consult with a doctor online and obtain a prescription for certain types of medications at a cost of US$20  regardless of insurance status. Medical testing services, which vary in price, are also offered through the platform. In 2021, GoodRx acquired the health video company HealthiNation.

Key people
The Santa Monica-based startup was founded in September 2011 by Trevor Bezdek and former Facebook executives Doug Hirsch and Scott Marlette. Marlette was one of the first 20 employees at Facebook and built Facebook's photo application. In 2005, Hirsch was the Vice President of Product at Facebook, working closely with Mark Zuckerberg.

Controversy
On February 25, 2020, Consumer Reports published an article stating that GoodRx shared user data − specifically, pseudonymized advertising ID numbers that companies use to track the behavior of web users across websites, the names of the drugs that users browsed, and the pharmacies where user sought to fill prescriptions − with Google, Facebook, and around 20 other internet-based companies. A few days after the Consumer Reports article was published, GoodRx published a statement saying it made changes to prevent user search data on medical conditions and pharmaceuticals from being shared with Facebook.
In March, 2020, GoodRx stopped sending data about users’ prescriptions to Facebook.

On February 1, 2023, the Federal Trade Commission fined GoodRx US$1.5 million for sharing sensitive user information to Facebook and Google.

See also
Health care finance in the United States
RIP Medical Debt

References

External links
 

Companies based in Santa Monica, California
Health care companies based in California
Pharmacy in the United States
American companies established in 2011
Health care companies established in 2011
Telemedicine
Mobile applications
2020 initial public offerings
Companies listed on the Nasdaq
2011 establishments in California
Medical technology companies of the United States